Valentine Werier,  (June 29, 1917 – April 22, 2014) was a Canadian journalist for the Winnipeg Free Press and prior to its closing in August 1980, The Winnipeg Tribune. Werier was honoured with the Order of Manitoba in 2004 and the Order of Canada. He was born in Winnipeg in 1917.

Werier died at the age of 96 on April 22, 2014.

References

External links 
 Val Werier - an inventory of his papers at the University of Manitoba Archives and Special Collections.

1917 births
2014 deaths
Canadian newspaper journalists
Members of the Order of Canada
Members of the Order of Manitoba